Colonel John Campbell of Shankstown was a Scottish soldier.

The second son of James Campbell, 2nd Earl of Loudoun and brother of Hugh Campbell, 3rd Earl of Loudoun and Sir James Campbell of Lawers, he sat in the Parliament of Scotland for Ayrshire from 1700 to 1702.

He died without issue.

References
 Joseph Foster, Members of Parliament, Scotland (1882) p. 56-57

Shire Commissioners to the Parliament of Scotland
Members of the Parliament of Scotland 1689–1702
Younger sons of earls
Year of birth missing
Year of death missing
18th-century deaths